Spilarctia lungtani is a moth in the family Erebidae. It was described by Franz Daniel in 1943. It is found in China (Shanghai, Jiangsu, Zhejiang, Hunan, Fujian, Sichuan, Anhui, Hubei, Guangxi).

References

Moths described in 1943
lungtani